Abatus ingens is a species of sea urchin of the family Schizasteridae. Their armour is covered with spines. It is in the genus Abatus and lives in the sea. Abatus ingens was first scientifically described in 1926 by Koehler.

References 

Spatangoida
Animals described in 1926